Obet Rivaldo Yulius (born July 22, 1995) is an Indonesian professional footballer who plays as a defensive midfielder.

Club career

Persekat Tegal
He was signed for Persekat Tegal to play in Liga 2 in the 2020 season.

Hizbul Wathan FC
In 2021, Obet signed a contract with Indonesian Liga 2 club Hizbul Wathan. He made his league debut on 27 September against Persijap Jepara.

References

External links
 Obet Yulius at Liga Indonesia
 Obet Yulius at Soccerway

1995 births
Living people
Indonesian footballers
Persegres Gresik players
Gresik United players
Association football midfielders
People from Tulungagung Regency
Sportspeople from East Java